Alucard ("Dracula" spelled backwards) may refer to:

Characters
 Alucard (Castlevania), a character in Castlevania media and the half-human/half-vampire son of Dracula
 Alucard (Hellsing), the main character in Hellsing
 Count Alucard (character), the title character in the 1943 film Son of Dracula and other works
 Alucard, a character in the 1967 film Dr. Terror's Gallery of Horrors
 Alucard, a playable character in the mobile MOBA game, Mobile Legends: Bang Bang
 Alucard, a villain in Ted Dekker's Lost Books series
 Alucard van Heusen, a vampire in the series Wizards of Waverly Place
 Alexander Lucard ("A. Lucard"), the alias used by Dracula in Dracula: The Series
 Dr. Alucard, the alias used by Dracula in The Batman vs. Dracula
 Johnny Alucard, a character in the film Dracula A.D. 1972
 Rachel Alucard, a playable character from the Blazblue series
 The most powerful vampire in the manga Rosario + Vampire

Music
 Alucard Music, a British music label
 "Alucard", a song from the album Gentle Giant, by Gentle Giant
 "Alucard", a song from the EP Seepage, by Tech N9ne
 "Sevil Alucard", a song from the album The Dark Chapter, by Michael Romeo

Other
 Alucard, a kernel variant and hotplug driver for Android devices

See also
 Dracula, an 1897 Gothic horror novel
 Dracula (disambiguation)